The 1st IAAF World Athletics Final was held at the Stade Louis II, in Monte Carlo, Monaco on 13 September and 14 September 2003. It was the series finale for the 2003 IAAF World Outdoor Meetings and the successor tournament to the 2002 IAAF Grand Prix Final.

The hammer throw event for men and women had to take place in Szombathely, Hungary a week previous as the Monaco stadium was not large enough to hold the event.

One of the biggest shocks came in the pole vault where current world record holder Yelena Isinbayeva failed to take a medal after only managing to clear 4.50 metres.

Medal summary

Men

Women

Medals table

References
Official 1st IAAF World Athletics Final Site

World Athletics Final
World Athletics Final
World Athletics Final
IAAF World Athletics Final
International athletics competitions hosted by Hungary
International athletics competitions hosted by Monaco